{{DISPLAYTITLE:Conway group Co3}}

In the area of modern algebra known as group theory, the Conway group  is a sporadic simple group of order
   210375371123
 = 495766656000
 ≈ 5.

History and properties

The Schur multiplier and the outer automorphism group are both trivial.

Representations 

Co3 acts on the unique 23-dimensional even lattice of determinant 4 with no roots, given by the orthogonal complement of a norm 4 vector of the Leech lattice. This gives 23-dimensional representations over any field; over fields of characteristic 2 or 3 this can be reduced to a 22-dimensional faithful representation.

Co3 has a doubly transitive permutation representation on 276 points.

Maximal subgroups 
Some maximal subgroups fix or reflect 2-dimensional sublattices of the Leech lattice. It is usual to define these planes by h-k-l triangles: triangles including the origin as a vertex, with edges (differences of vertices) being vectors of types h, k, and l.

 McL:2 – McL fixes a 2-2-3 triangle.
 HS – fixes a 2-3-3 triangle.
 U4(3).22
 M23 – fixes a 2-3-4 triangle.
 35:(2 × M11) - fixes or reflects a 3-3-3 triangle.
 2.Sp6(2) – centralizer of involution class 2A (trace 8), which moves 240 of the 276 type 2-2-3 triangles
 U3(5):S3
 31+4:4S6
 24.A8
 PSL(3,4):(2 × S3)
 2 × M12 – centralizer of involution class 2B (trace 0), which moves 264 of the 276 type 2-2-3 triangles
 [210.33]
 S3 × PSL(2,8):3 - normalizer of 3-subgroup generated by class 3C (trace 0) element
 A4 × S5

Conjugacy classes
Traces of matrices in a standard 24-dimensional representation of Co3 are shown.  The names of conjugacy classes are taken from the Atlas of Finite Group Representations.

The cycle structures listed act on the 276 2-2-3 triangles that share the fixed type 3 side.

Generalized Monstrous Moonshine

In analogy to monstrous moonshine for the monster M, for Co3, the relevant McKay-Thompson series is  where one can set the constant term a(0) = 24,

and η(τ) is the Dedekind eta function.

References 

 

 Reprinted in

External links 
 MathWorld: Conway Groups
 Atlas of Finite Group Representations: Co3 version 2
 Atlas of Finite Group Representations: Co3 version 3

Sporadic groups
John Horton Conway